Peggy Farrell may refer to:
 Peggy Farrell (politician) (1920–2003), Irish businesswoman and Fianna Fáil politician
 Peggy Farrell (costume designer) (1932–2021), American costume designer